Felix Geisler (born 20 March 1997) is a German footballer who plays as a midfielder for NOFV-Oberliga Nord club VfB Krieschow.

References

External links
 
 

1997 births
People from Luckau
Footballers from Brandenburg
Living people
German footballers
Association football midfielders
FC Energie Cottbus players
FSV Zwickau players
3. Liga players
Regionalliga players
Oberliga (football) players